MusiCares Foundation is a non-profit organization established in 1989 and incorporated in 1993 by the National Academy of Recording Arts and Sciences. Meant for musicians to have a place to turn in times of financial, personal, or medical crisis, its primary purpose is to focus the resources and attention of the music industry on human service issues which directly impact the health and welfare of the music community. The foundation's programs include emergency financial assistance, addiction recovery, outreach and leadership activities, and senior housing. MusiCares also offers hearing clinics backstage at several major festivals around the U.S. to help musicians protect their ears. Since 1989, MusiCares has distributed more than $48 million to artists in need.

In September 2004, MusiCares acquired the Musicians Assistance Program, a similar program assisting musicians in need, including drug rehabilitation.

MusiCares awards recording artists with the "Person of the Year Award", to commend musicians for their artistic achievement in the music industry and dedication to philanthropy, and with the "Stevie Ray Vaughan Award", to honor musicians on their commitment to helping others in the addiction recovery process.

MusiCares MAP Fund Benefit Concert
To help raise funding for the program, a MusiCares MAP Fund Benefit Concert is held annually since 2005. Among the awards given at the event is the Stevie Ray Vaughan Award, named after the late guitarist Stevie Ray Vaughan, which recognizes musicians for their devotion to helping other addicts struggling with the recovery process.

Founded by longtime musician and addiction recovery activist Buddy Arnold, the event was originally called Musicians' Assistance Program (MAP) Awards. Eric Clapton was honored with the Musicians' Assistance Program's (MAP) first Stevie Ray Vaughan Award on November 2, 1999. In 2004, MusiCares acquired MAP and merged the two programs under the MusiCares banner.

The 2010 Musicares MAP Fund benefit concert celebrated Women In Recovery and honored former U.S. first lady Betty Ford and the Betty Ford Center. Susan Ford Bales accepted the MusiCares MAP Fund award on behalf of her mother.

Stevie Ray Vaughan Award
Recipients
 1999: Eric Clapton
 2000: David Crosby
 2001: Bonnie Raitt
 2002: Ivan Neville
 2003: Steven Tyler

Awards given after the MusiCares/MAP merger...
 2005: Dave Navarro
 2006: James Hetfield
 2007: Chris Cornell
 2008: Alice Cooper
 2009: Anthony Kiedis
 2011: Dave Gahan
 2012: Jerry Cantrell
 2013: Chester Bennington
 2014: Ozzy Osbourne
 2015: Pete Townshend
 2016: Smokey Robinson
 2017: Adam Clayton
 2018: Mike McCready
 2019: Macklemore

MusiCares From the Heart Award
The MusiCares From the Heart Award is given to artists for their unconditional friendship and dedication to the mission and goals of the organization during the MusiCares MAP Fund Benefit Concert. The first recipient was Goldenvoice in memory of Rick Van Santen.

Recipients
 2005: Goldenvoice (in memory of Rick Van Santen)
 2006: Bill Silva
 2007: Jeff McClusky
 2008: Slash
 2011: Kevin Lyman
 2012: Neil Lasher (deceased 2020, 73 years) 
 2013: Tony Alva
 2014: Jeff Greenberg
 2015: Bill Curbishley

See also
MusiCares Person of the Year
MusiCares COVID-19 Relief Fund

References

External links
Official site
Donation site

Organizations established in 1993
Music organizations based in the United States
Santa Monica, California
Organizations based in California
501(c)(3) organizations